Lawrence Conley Cobb (May 7, 1894 – February 11, 1945) served in the California State Assembly for the 58th district from 1931 to 1935 and during World War I he served in the United States Army.

References

External links
 

United States Army personnel of World War I
Republican Party members of the California State Assembly
20th-century American politicians
1894 births
1945 deaths